Gattonvale Offstream Storage is a water storage reservoir located 23 km southeast of Collinsville, Central Queensland adjacent to the Bowen River Weir. It is intended to improve reliability of water supply to the Collinsville Power Station, coal mines, and townships. The storage is filled by pumping water from the Bowen River Weir during high flows in the river system during the wet season. Sunwater constructed the storage to a capacity of 5,200 megalitres, with the storage officially opened in December 2005.

References

North Queensland
Reservoirs in Queensland
Central Queensland